Anatol Herzfeld (born Karl-Heinz Herzfeld; 21 January 1931 – 10 May 2019) was a German sculptor and mixed-media artist, and also a policeman. A student of Joseph Beuys, he primarily used wood, iron and stone as materials. As an artist, he simply signed Anatol. He received attention for a happening, crossing the Rhine in a boat he created with Beuys, after Beuys had been expelled from the Kunstakademie Düsseldorf.

Anatol lived and worked on the Museum Insel Hombroich. His monumental sculptures were presented at the documenta in Kassel several times, and at the Nationalgalerie in Berlin, among others. Some of them are at international locations such as the National Assembly in Paramaribo, Suriname. On the occasion of his 80th birthday, two exhibitions were staged in his honour, one about him as an artist, the other as a policeman.

Life and work
Herzfeld was born  in Insterburg, East Prussia (now Chernyakhovsk, Russia). During World War II, he and his family escaped to the Rhineland, where he first was a blacksmith, then a policeman. Teaching traffic rules to school children using puppets was one of his specialties.

He studied sculpture at the Kunstakademie Düsseldorf with Joseph Beuys from 1964 to 1972. He was influenced by his professor's ideas, especially by the concept of "social sculpture". Therefore, telling stories, talking about current political themes, and working with his own hands became the basis of his artistic work. He chose his name as an artist, Anatol, after Anatole Kuragin from Tolstoy's War and Peace.

Anatol also created happenings together with Beuys. An action by Beuys and Anatol took place in the pub  in Düsseldorf in 1968. Three of Beuys's students, Joachim Duckwitz, Ulrich Meister and Johannes Stüttgen, were shown handcuffed to a steel table made by Anatol and sitting on steel chairs. Red and green signals, operated by Anatol from a corner of the room, directed each sitter as to when they could speak. Beuys stood in the opposite corner of the room, silently making different gestures. After Beuys was expelled from the Kunstakademie in 1972, Anatol protested in an action the following year. On 20 July 1973, he placed Beuys in a dugout canoe that he had built, and they crossed the Rhine from Oberkassel, where Beuys lived, to the Akademie, in a symbolic journey of a return of his master titled Die Heimholung des Joseph Beuys.

For two years, Anatol was also a student of architect . Furthermore, he regularly participated in ring talks (Ringgespräche) about art theory.

In 1975, he founded the Freie Akademie Oldenburg. From 1979 to 1981, he taught art at the Kunstakademie Düsseldorf. In 1982, he settled on the Museum Insel Hombroich, running a studio in a former barn. In 1996, he was appointed honorary professor of fine arts by the University of South Dakota in Vermillion.

He died in Moers on 10 May 2019 at age 88 after a short illness.

Exhibitions
Anatol's art was presented in exhibitions including:
 1972: documenta 5, Fridericianum, Kassel
 1976: „mit-, neben-, gegen“ Beuys und seine Klasse, Frankfurter Kunstverein, Frankfurt
 1977: documenta 6, Fridericianum, Kassel
 1982: documenta 7, Karlsaue, Kassel
 1983: Nationalgalerie, Berlin
 1985: Antonius Höckelmann / Anatol Herzfeld, Düsseldorf

 2002: Städtische Galerie im Park Viersen, Viersen

 2011: Exhibition on the occasion on his 80th birthday, 
 2014: Anatol. Arbeiten aus der Sammlung Gertz.,

Works
 Die Schule, Museum Insel Hombroich, Neuss

 Die Jade (1975), Dangast
 Das Traumschiff Tante Olga (1976), documenta 5 in Kassel, then Heinrich-Schütz-Schule there
 Die Neue Jade (1979), Dangast

 Die Kirche (1988), Museum Insel Hombroich, Neuss
 Triptychon (1991), St. Agnes, Cologne
 Das Parlament (1991), Museum Insel Hombroich, Neuss
 Eisenmänner / Wächter (1993), Museum Insel Hombroich, Neuss

 Die Wächter der Goitzsche (2000), Bitterfeld
 Die Wächter der Kinder (2002), Viersen
 Ur-Haus (2004), Busan, South Korea
 Heilkunst (2005), Graz, Austria
 Head of Joseph Beuys (2008), Meerbusch-Büderich
 Wächter (2010/2011), Selm-Bork
 Demokratie, National Assembly in Paramaribo, Suriname

Awards
 1991 Cross of the Order of Merit of the Federal Republic of Germany
 1992

Gallery

References

Further reading
 Anatol: Besuch bei Tante Olga in Dangast. Oldenburger Kunstverein, 14 February – 2 March 1975.
 Gerd Winkler: "Alle Lieben Anatol". In pardon, no. 3, March 1976, pp. 114–120.
 Helga Meister: "Anatol", In Die Kunstszene Düsseldorf. Recklinghausen 1979, pp. 32–34.
 Anatol – Ausstellung im Kunstforum Rottweil. Exh. cat., Rottweil 1980.
 Manfred Boetzkes (ed.): Anatol: Bilder 1979–1984. Exh. cat., Roemer- und Pelizaeus-Museum, Hildesheim 1984.
 Karl-Heinz Hering, Anatol – Bilder u. Plastiken 1965–1985; Arbeitszeit. Kunstverein für die Rheinlande und Westfalen, 20 April – 2 June 1985, Düsseldorf 1985.
 Anatol: Mein Leben; neue Bilder auf Blei. 14 March – 30 April 1986. Galerie Vömel, Düsseldorf 1986.
 Friedhelm Mennekes: "Aus dieser Fremde mache ich Bilder: Anatol im Gespräch mit Friedhelm Mennekes". In Kunst und Kirche, 49, 1986, pp. 154–158.
 Michel Ruepp: Anatol – Natur und Technik. Museum Bochum, 21 March – 3 May 1987, Bochum 1987.
 Anatol: Arbeitszeit "Das Bleihaus". Ausstellung "Blei-Arbeiten", 23 April – 31 May 1987. Germanisches Nationalmuseum, Nuremberg 1987.
 Jacek Barski (ed.): Lovis-Corinth-Preis 1992 der Künstlergilde: Karl Heinz Herzfeld – Anatol, Friedrich Sieber, Ursula Doerk. Ausstellung der Preisträger, Museum Ostdeutsche Galerie Regensburg, 14 November 1992 – 10 January 1993, Regensburg 1992.
 Anatol: Arbeiten 1983 bis 1993 – Jesus Christus muß uns zu Freunden machen. Exh. cat., Gerhard-Hauptmann-Haus, Düsseldorf 1994.
 Anatol – Memento mori – Bilder, Skulpturen, Objekte und Arbeiten auf Papier und Pappe. Exh. cat., Stadtmuseum Ratingen. 11 June – 20 August 1995. Ratingen 1995.
 Marie-Luise Otten and Ursula Mildner, "Anatol und Ratingen – ein Gespräch". In: Die Quecke, 65, 1995, pp. 82–87.
 ANATOL, 17 March – 6 May 2001. Stiftung Insel Hombroich, Neuss 2001.
 Christiane Dressler: "Anatol, der Mann, der aus dem Osten kam – zum 70. Geburtstag des Künstlers". In Kunstzeit. 1. Schuffelen, Pulheim 2001, pp. 64–73.
 Anatol zum 75. Geburtstag. 28 April – 30 June 2006. Galerie Alex Vömel, Düsseldorf 2006.
 Eva Beuys: Joseph Beuys: Handaktion 1968 & Anatol Herzfeld: Der Tisch 1968. Göttingen 2009.

External links

 
 Ingeborg Gottschalk, "Anatol Herzfeld"
 Rhein-Kreis Neuss: 75. Geburtstag von Anatol Herzfeld 
 Revierpassagen: Museum Bochum: Anatol und seine Arbeitszeit
 WDR: WestArt: Anatol Herzfeld: Das Parlament, Museum Insel Hombroich
 Anatol Herzfeld Galerie Scheel
 Robert Beerscht: Anatol Herzfeld
 Freie Akademie Oldenburg
 Rainer Bartel: Düsseldorfer Gesichter (9): Anatol Herzfeld – Polizist, Verkehrskasper, Bildhauer, Arbeiter the-duesseldorfer.de

1931 births
2019 deaths
People from Insterburg
People from East Prussia
German male artists
Modern artists
German contemporary artists
Joseph Beuys
Kunstakademie Düsseldorf alumni
Recipients of the Cross of the Order of Merit of the Federal Republic of Germany